Natale Zaninetti (24 March 1907 – 10 March 1978) was an Italian racing cyclist. He rode in the 1928 Tour de France.

References

External links
 

1907 births
1978 deaths
Italian male cyclists
Place of birth missing
People from Borgosesia
Sportspeople from the Province of Vercelli
Cyclists from Piedmont